Hampton is a town in Calhoun County, Arkansas, United States. The population was 1,324 at the 2010 census. The town is the county seat of Calhoun County.

Hampton is part of the Camden Micropolitan Statistical Area.

Geography
Hampton is located east of the center of Calhoun County at  (33.536831, -92.465521). U.S. Routes 278 and 167 intersect in the town. US 278 leads west  to Camden and east  to Warren, while US 167 leads north  to Fordyce and south  to El Dorado.

Demographics

2020 census

As of the 2020 United States census, there were 1,181 people, 619 households, and 390 families residing in the town.

2000 census
As of the census of 2000, there were 1,579 people, 619 households, and 402 families residing in the town. The racial makeup of the town was 66.18% White, 32.05% Black or African American, 0.06% Native American, 1.08% from other races, and 0.63% from two or more races.  1.39% of the population were Hispanic or Latino of any race.

There were 619 households, out of which 30.5% had children under the age of 18 living with them, 44.3% were married couples living together, 17.6% had a female householder with no husband present, and 34.9% were non-families. 32.8% of all households were made up of individuals, and 13.9% had someone living alone who was 65 years of age or older.  The average household size was 2.36 and the average family size was 2.99.

In the town, the population was spread out, with 25.0% under the age of 18, 7.5% from 18 to 24, 25.0% from 25 to 44, 22.5% from 45 to 64, and 19.9% who were 65 years of age or older.  The median age was 40 years. For every 100 females, there were 79.2 males.  For every 100 females age 18 and over, there were 74.9 males.

The median income for a household in the town was $25,057, and the median income for a family was $29,948. Males had a median income of $29,375 versus $18,583 for females. The per capita income for the town was $15,489.  About 19.7% of families and 22.9% of the population were below the poverty line, including 30.3% of those under age 18 and 20.7% of those age 65 or over.

Political affiliation 
Hampton is divided politically though generally leans towards the Republican Party, as while the innermost regions are somewhat supportive of the Democratic Party, though the outer regions are staunch supporters of the GOP. In the 2020 presidential election, Democrat Joe Biden won the inner regions of Hampton by 4.2 percentage points, while Republican Donald Trump took the outer regions at margins varying from 9.5 percentage points to unanimous support for Trump.

Education 
Public education is available via Hampton School District based in Hampton, with students graduating from Hampton High School. The school district encompasses  of land including all of Hampton and portions of several Calhoun County communities including  Harrell, and Tinsman, and Locust Bayou.

Transport 
Hampton is centered at the intersection of US routes 278 and 167. Arkansas Highway 274 also runs through Hampton in a U-formation, with the northern portion running concurrently with US 167 northwards while another end continues to the northeast towards Tinsman. Arkansas Highway 203 also starts in central Hampton and runs to the northwest.

A small airstrip is located immediately to the south of Hampton, though it does not hold an air traffic control tower. Air transport to Hampton's closest links are through Harrell Field in northeast Camden for general aviation and South Arkansas Regional Airport in western El Dorado for commercial service. The closest airport with over one million passengers per year is Clinton National Airport in Little Rock, and the closest airport with direct international flights is Memphis International Airport.

Notable people 
 Harry Thomason, film and television director and producer
 Tommy Tomlinson, guitarist associated with Johnny Horton; inductee of the Rockabilly Hall of Fame
 Wayne Harris, NFF College Hall of Fame player at Arkansas and Canadian Football League Hall of Fame player

See also 
National Register of Historic Places listings in Calhoun County, Arkansas

References

Cities in Calhoun County, Arkansas
Cities in Arkansas
County seats in Arkansas
Camden, Arkansas micropolitan area